TJ Jiskra Domažlice is a Czech football club located in Domažlice. It currently plays in the Bohemian Football League, which is the third tier of the Czech football system.

The team won Divize A, part of the Czech Fourth Division in the 2010–11 season.

References

External links
  

Football clubs in the Czech Republic
Association football clubs established in 1948
Domažlice
1948 establishments in Czechoslovakia